Hari Naraian Singh was an Indian politician and member of the Bharatiya Janata Party. Singh was a member of the Himachal Pradesh Legislative Assembly from the Nalagarh constituency in Solan district. He was succeeded by Lakhvinder Singh Rana.

References 

People from Solan district
Bharatiya Janata Party politicians from Himachal Pradesh
1952 births
2011 deaths
21st-century Indian politicians
Himachal Pradesh MLAs 1998–2003
Himachal Pradesh MLAs 2003–2007
Himachal Pradesh MLAs 2007–2012